Susanna van Lee (ca. 1630 – buried 13 January 1700) was a Dutch stage actor and ballet dancer. 

She was married to Conrad Rochus Eeckhout (ca. 1630–1701), musician. She was a member of the theatre company of Jan Baptist van Fornenbergh (1624–1697), and as such toured in Northern Germany, Denmark and Sweden. She was also active at the theatre of Amsterdam in 1655–1700.

At her performance at the court of Queen Christina of Sweden in 1653, she, together with her colleagues Ariana Nozeman and Elizabeth Baer Kalbergen, became the first professional female actors known by name to have performed in Sweden. 

In 1655, she, again with her colleagues Ariana Nozeman and Elizabeth Baer Kalbergen, became the first women to be hired at the theatre of Amsterdam. She was an appreciated actress, and also performed in ballet and prepared costumes. 

Her husband was a violinist at the theatre, and they also managed a tavern.

In 1700, she died in Amsterdam.

References 
  DVN, een project van Huygens ING en OGC (UU). Bronvermelding: Malou Nozeman, Lee, Susanna van, in: Digitaal Vrouwenlexicon van Nederland. URL: http://resources.huygens.knaw.nl/vrouwenlexicon/lemmata/data/Lee [13/01/2014]  

1630 births
1700 deaths
Dutch stage actresses
17th-century Dutch actresses
Dutch ballerinas
17th-century ballet dancers